Alvaro Koslowski (born April 20, 1971) is a Brazilian sprint canoer who competed in the early 1990s. At the 1992 Summer Olympics in Barcelona, he was eliminated in the repechages of both the K-2 500 m event and the K-2 1000 m events.

References
Sports-Reference.com profile

1971 births
Brazilian male canoeists
Canoeists at the 1992 Summer Olympics
Living people
Olympic canoeists of Brazil
Brazilian people of Polish descent
Pan American Games medalists in canoeing
Pan American Games bronze medalists for Brazil
Canoeists at the 1995 Pan American Games
Medalists at the 1995 Pan American Games
20th-century Brazilian people